Oberlin Academy Preparatory School, originally Oberlin Institute and then Preparatory Department of Oberlin College, was a private preparatory school in Oberlin, Ohio which operated from 1833 until 1916. It opened as Oberlin  Institute which became Oberlin College in 1850. The secondary school serving local and boarding students continued as a department of the college. The school and college admitted African Americans and women. This was very unusual and controversial. It was located on the Oberlin College campus for much of its history and many of its students continued on to study at Oberlin College. Various alumni and staff went on to notable careers.

History

Oberlin Institute, a private secondary school, was established in 1832 or 1833, 27 years before Oberlin High School. Public high schools were uncommon at the time, and as a result, many colleges found that their incoming students were poorly prepared for their academic studies.  This led some colleges to establish their own high schools, organized as preparatory departments of the college.

Oberlin Institute faced opposition from conservative Whites in Ohio who opposed its admittance of African Americans. Nevertheless, in 1850 the school was granted a charter and became Oberlin College. The undergraduate education program continued afterwards as a preparatory school sometimes referred to as "prep".

The Preparatory Department was the only primary education in Oberlin until the community organized a school district and eventually launched public schools.  The Preparatory Department had an enrollment of 690 students in 1890.

Sarah Watson, the first African American woman to attend Oberlin, enrolled in the Preparatory Department in 1842.  Between 1833 and 1865, at least 140 black women studied at Oberlin, most of them in the Preparatory Department.

In 1887, the school moved into French Hall and part of Society Hall. From 1892 the secondary school was called Oberlin Academy. The school's mission was to prepare students for college.

Edward Henry Fairchild was the school's principal from 1853 until 1869. An abolitionist, he went on to become president of Berea College, a coeducational and integrated institution in Kentucky. John Fisher Peck also served as the school's principal. His daughter, Emily Peck, tutored Latin and Greek at the preparatory department and was an artist who depicted fellow Oberlin alums in sculpture.

Booker T. Washington, who had close ties to Oberlin College and hired teachers from the school at Tuskegee Institute, sent his son Ernst to Oberlin Academy in 1904 and 1905.

By 1905, the school's enrollment was declining.  One of the factors for the decline was that public high schools were becoming widely available by that time. In January 1910, the Oberlin Alumni Magazine published an entry on the school, its significance, and the need for continued support of it. In 1912 a new building opened for the academy and the Oberlin Academy Alumni Association was organized.

The school was removed from campus from 1912 to 1916 and occupied the Johnson mansion (now known as Johnson House) on South Professor Street in Oberlin.  The Johnson House is now the Hebrew Heritage House, a college residence  for Jewish students.

In 1915, the college announced that it would close the Preparatory Academy.  In that same year, the academy was listed in A Handbook of the Best Private Schools of the United States and Canada, which stated:

Alumni
Alumni include:

Calvin Brainerd Cady, musician, educator, and writer
Jacob Dolson Cox, Union Army general, politician, and microbiologist
John Dube, founder of the South African Native National Congress
Richard Theodore Greener, Harvard College graduate and dean of Howard University School of Law
James Monroe Gregory
Luther Gulick (physician)
Charles Robert Hager
Forrest M. Hall
William W. Hannan
Ellen Hayes
Robert Maynard Hutchins
John Mercer Langston, first African American congressman from Virginia
Edmonia Lewis
Sinclair Lewis
George Herbert Mead
Byron R. Newton, journalist who attended from 1862 to 1864 
Benjamin F. Randolph
Josiah T. Settle
Henry H. Straight
Eloise Bibb Thompson
Katharine Wright

Faculty
Teachers included:
Sarah Cowles Little
Edgar Fauver
Fanny Jackson Coppin, the "first black teacher in the preparatory department."

Notes

References

Further reading
Descriptive Pamphlet of Oberlin Academy (1912), a special pamphlet issued to publicize the donation of Charles Martin Hall

Preparatory schools in Ohio
1833 establishments in Ohio
1916 disestablishments in Ohio